Sayyid Mohammad Mirmohammadi (‎; 1948 – 2 March 2020) was an Iranian conservative and principlist politician who served as the senior adviser to Iran's Supreme Leader Ayatollah Ali Khamenei, and a member of Expediency Discernment Council. He was the member of the 6th and 7th Iranian parliaments for Qom. Mohammad was a member of the central council of the Islamic Republic Party, presidential chief of staff during the presidencies of Ayatollah Ali Khamenei and Akbar Hashemi Rafsanjani, and secretary general of the Islamic Civilization Party.

Biography 
Mirmohammadi was born in Qom, Iran, in 1948. Mousa Shubairi Zanjani, a senior cleric, was his uncle.

Mirmohammadi was appointed a member of the Expediency Discernment Council in August 2017.

Mirmohammadi died from coronavirus disease 2019 (COVID-19) on 2 March 2020, aged 71. At the time, he was the highest-ranking official within Iran's leadership to die of the virus. His mother had also died of COVID-19.

References

 
1948 births
2020 deaths
Date of birth missing
Deaths from the COVID-19 pandemic in Iran
Deputies of Qom
Islamic Republican Party politicians
Members of the 6th Islamic Consultative Assembly
Members of the 7th Islamic Consultative Assembly
Members of the Expediency Discernment Council
People from Qom
Vice presidents of Iran